Murgud is a city and a municipal council in Kolhapur district in the Indian state of Maharashtra.This City has a rich culture in various sports such as wrestling and volleyball.
In Murgud, there is a big market place and at the same time the Murgud Traders Association is an association organization. Mr. Digambar Bhilavadikar is the president and Mohan Gujar is the vice president and there are other directors in it.

Geography
It has an average elevation of 556  metres (1824 feet).

The main water source for drinking and farming is Sarpirajirao lake. It is situated to the east of Murgud. This lake has its own historic background. The major crop in Murgud area is sugarcane, as there is water available year-round. As a result, there are a number of sugar factories around the city. Murgud is located in Maharashtra Why it is named as Murgud? Basically Murgud is Kannada word. Mur=Three Gud=Mountain This City (Village) is encompassed between three mountains so it is called Murgud. There were too many freedom fighters and Two of them were Tukaram Bharmal and Hari Krishna Shirsekar.

Demographics
As of the 2011 India census, Murgud had a population of 11,194. Males constitute 51% of the population and females 49%. Murgud has an average literacy rate of 73%, higher than the national average of 59.5%: male literacy is 81%, and female literacy is 64%. In Murgud, 11% of the population is under 6 years of age. Murgud is having historical background which dates back to 1600.
As of the 2001 India census[2], Murgud had a population of 9200. Males constitute 51% of the population and females 49%. Murgud has an average literacy rate of 73%, higher than the national average of 59.5%: male literacy is 81%, and female literacy is 64%. In Murgud, 11% of the population is under 6 years of age. Marathi Hindi & English Language are understood by majority of people here. Murgud – location, longitude, latitude, Altitude, Population.

Out of total population, 4,125 were engaged in work or business activity. Of this 2,990 were males while 1,135 were females. In census survey, worker is defined as person who does business, job, service, and cultivator and labour activity. Of total 4125 working population, 85.41% were engaged in Main Work while 14.59% of total workers were engaged in Marginal Work.

Murgud municipal council established on 1 September 1921. It is working according to Maharashtra municipal council. Act 1965. According to provision in chapter 3 section 49 (1) (C) (Solid) & chapter 16 the Murgud municipal council is responsible for solid waste

Environmental protection according to provisions of chapter 3 45 (1) (A-B) of this Act. Municipal council implementing Urban waste mgmt rule, 2000.

Murgud is having 11.71 km2. area divided into 17 wards. The population was 10,294 according to 2001 census.

The city produces approx 3 MT of solid waste per day.

The solid waste produced is collected twice in a day in each ward by 58 workers [6 female + 22 male including drivers a municipal employees while 5 female & 25 male including 2 drivers on contract basis].

The collected waste is transported by a true & 2 tractor trailers. The disposal site is located 1 km away from the centre of city having 1 are area & life span of 10 years. Though the city having 11 km2. area waste is generated & collected from 2 km2. area. The main sources are- Residential – 1.75 Tons. Shops, commercial Institutional - 0.50 Tons Construction - 0.25 Sweeping - 0.25 Hotels Restaurants - 0.25

The municipality uses around 60 Ghamelas, 60 Pharadas, 30 brows & 5. Gumboots & Dresses are provided to the workers. Besides this so handcarts (3x2x1.5 feet) are engaged in waste collection.

Cost involved in the SWM- Workers- Wages - 13,62,772 Dress - 1 & 977 Allowance - 11,33,361 Tools & Equipments - 8750 Disinfection - 1564 Transportation Operation & maintenance - 1,60,982 Hand carts - 2,04,940 Insurance - 1,60,182 Contractor wages - 3,56,300 Total 32,60,000 Total length of roads is 13 km having 6-7m breadth Inadequate treatment facility by open gutter & irrigation 80% of the area is covered with gutters open drain type carrying 640m3/day of domestic effluents generated while 20% area having no drainage system along with the effluents generated by88 public latrines & 15 toilets. Solid waste generation sources are 2 primary schools, 2 secondary schools, 2 Junior college & 1 Junior college, 18 Hospitals, 15 medical stores approx 200 commercial shops.

Sports

There are around 3 to 4 akhadas in Murgud. Some of them are Lal Aakhada, Sai Aakhada, Jay Shivaraj Talim, Rana Aakhada, saibaba Ganesh Tarun madal etc.

Education
['One of the famous Science Academy by Mr Mahesh Patil sir(Mathematics) and Mr Pankaj Sarang Sir(Science)
STATE BOARD , CBSE , NCERT ']

Shivraj Vidyalaya murgud, Shivraj Vidyalaya Junior College murgud, Senior College murgud, murgud Vidyalaya murgud, murgud Vidyalay Junior College murgud, yashvantrao Chavan Open University Nashik branch murgud, Savardekar classes, Jai shivray Education Society, science study room etc.

References

Cities and towns in Kolhapur district